Amerijet International Airlines, Inc. is an American cargo airline headquartered in Miami, United States. The airline delivers air freight with its fleet of Boeing 757s and Boeing 767s from its main hub at the Miami International Airport to 48 destinations throughout the Caribbean, Mexico, Central and South America. Their network spans 476 destinations throughout the world, including Europe, Asia, the Americas, Africa, and the Middle East.

History

The airline was established and started operations in 1974. It was founded by David Bassett (Chairman and Chief Executive) and a partner with a leased Cessna 401, operating passenger and cargo services between the US and the Bahamas. In 1976, Amerijet became a freight only carrier. In late 1978, courier contracts were taken from Purolator, FedEx, UPS, DHL and Airborne Express in the early 1980s. In 1982, Bassett bought out his partner and created Amerijet International.

The main services that Amerijet offers are general cargo shipping, pharmaceutical shipping, perishable shipping, oversized load shipping, live animal transport, and charter services. Among their airfreight operation, Amerijet also provides trucking services, including expedited delivery. Throughout the Caribbean, Central and South America, Amerijet offers last mile delivery for commercial customers.

Amerijet has been a target internationally of animal rights activists for their transportation of animals for experimentation purposes in later years, particularly in conjunction with the Miami-based company Primate Products. Amerijet has been coming under increasing pressure in South Florida, with monthly demonstrations in front of its Fort Lauderdale office, and some of Amerijet's upper management have even been protested at their homes. To date, two activists have been arrested in front of Amerijet's office. On Valentine's Day 2011, Amerijet ended their involvement in the primate trade with these words, "Amerijet has ceased transporting primates for any and all purposes."

Amerijet operated under Chapter 11 bankruptcy protection from August 22 until December 31, 2001, from which it emerged after financial restructuring.  Amerijet International was majority-owned by H.I.G. from 2001 to 2016. On July 26, 2016, H.I.G. Capital completed the sale of Amerijet, the Miami-based all-cargo carrier to private equity firm ZS Fund L.P. Amerijet's new CEO, Vicken L. Karjian joined the company in July 2016. Amerijet and the International Brotherhood of Teamsters reached an agreement on September 14, 2009 on a new four-year labor contract covering flight crew employees.

In July 2022, Maersk announced that they had reached a CMI agreement with Amerijet to operate three of their new Boeing 767-300 Freighters. Maersk will take delivery of three 767-300Fs from Boeing and outsource their operation to Amerijet. The aircraft were originally ordered by Longhao Airlines, but were never delivered to them. Maersk has said the aircraft would be used for trans-pacific flights.

Destinations

Fleet

Current fleet

The Amerijet International fleet consists of the following aircraft (as of December 2022):

Former fleet
The airline operated the following aircraft:

See also
List of airlines of the United States

References

External links

Official website

American companies established in 1974
Airlines established in 1974
Cargo airlines of the United States
Companies based in Fort Lauderdale, Florida
Companies based in Miami
Airlines based in Florida
1974 establishments in Florida